Reina Hispanoamericana 2022 will be the 31st edition of Reina Hispanoamericana pageant. Andrea Bazarte of Mexico will crown her successor at the end of the event.

Contestants 
29 contestants will compete for the title:

Notes

Debuts

Returns 
Last competed in 2019:

Crossovers 
Miss Universe
 2019:  – Serafina Nchama
Miss International
 2015:  – Eugenia Ávalos
Miss Grand International
 2020:  – Lady León (Top 20)

References 

Reina Hispanoamericana
2023 beauty pageants
Events in Santa Cruz de la Sierra